Judge McKenna may refer to:

Charles F. McKenna (1844–1922), judge for the United States District Court for the District of Puerto Rico
Juliet J. McKenna (born 1970), associate judge of the Superior Court of the District of Columbia
Lawrence M. McKenna (born 1933), judge of the United States District Court for the Southern District of New York

See also
Justice McKenna (disambiguation)